The Ngakawau Hydro Project is a proposed hydroelectric power station planned on the Ngakawau River in the northern section of the West Coast of the South Island of New Zealand. The project is being developed by Hydro Developments Limited.

In December 2008 Hydro Developments applied for resource consent for a 20MW hydro scheme (the Stockton Plateau Hydro Project) using polluted water from the Stockton Mine. Consent was granted in January 2010. The scheme was expected to reduce acid mine drainage from the mine into the Ngakawau River, and was supported by the Green Party of Aotearoa New Zealand.

In February 2010 Solid Energy applied for resource consent for a 49MW plant in the same area (the Stockton Hyydro Scheme). In October 2010 both parties announced that they had reached an agreement on using water from the Stockton plateau for hydro-electricity and that they would abandon their respective Environment Court appeals of the others' scheme. Solid Energy's application was rejected in mid-2010, but consent was granted by the Environment Court of New Zealand in May 2012. Solid Energy went into voluntary administration in August 2015, and the Stockton mine site was sold to Phoenix Coal. 

In November 2019 Hydro Developments applied for its projects resource consents to be extended. The schemes were subsequently merged into a single project called the Ngakawau scheme, and the consents were extended until 2026.

See also 

List of power stations in New Zealand

References 

Buller District
Hydroelectric power stations in New Zealand
Buildings and structures in the West Coast, New Zealand
Proposed hydroelectric power stations
Proposed renewable energy power stations in New Zealand